Ursula Dubosarsky (born Ursula Coleman; 1961 in Sydney) is an Australian writer of fiction and non-fiction for children and young adults, whose work is characterised by a child's vision and comic voice of both clarity and ambiguity. She has won nine national literary prizes, including five New South Wales Premier's Literary Awards, more than any other writer in the Awards' 30-year history. She was appointed the Australian Children's Laureate for 2020–2021.

She is the author of over 61 illustrated books and novels, which have been translated into 14 languages.  She has also written three non-fiction "Word Spy" books for children, illustrated by Tohby Riddle, about language, grammar and etymology. These books have won the New South Wales Premier's Literary Award, the Children's Book Council of Australia Book of the Year Award and the Junior Judges' Award. In the United States and Canada The Word Spy is published under the title The Word Snoop.

Her novel The Red Shoe is included in 1001 Children's Books You Must Read Before You Grow Up and is one of 200 significant works of Australian literature in the Copyright Agency's Reading Australia program. 
In 2014, the annual Christmas Windows of the department store David Jones  were based on her story Reindeer's Christmas Surprise,  and her book Too Many Elephants In this House, illustrated by Andrew Joyner, was chosen for the National Simultaneous Storytime. In 2018 the National Library of Australia published Midnight at the Library, illustrated by Ron Brooks, to celebrate the Library's 50-year anniversary. In 2019 a study room at Marrickville Library was named in honour of her novel The Blue Cat.

Three of her books have been adapted for theatre: The Red Shoe, The Terrible Plop and Too Many Elephants in This House.

She is the third child of Peter Coleman and Verna Susannah Coleman. She was named after the character of Ursula Brangwen in the 1915 novel The Rainbow by D.H. Lawrence. She attended Lindfield, Hunter's Hill and Chatswood Primary Schools, SCEGGS Darlinghurst, then studied at Sydney University and later Macquarie University. She is an Honorary Associate in the Department of English at Macquarie University and has taught courses in children's literature at Sydney University and the University of Technology, Sydney. She is a currently a member of the Library Council of New South Wales.

Awards

International

Hans Christian Andersen Award Nominee 2015

Astrid Lindgren Memorial Award Nominee 2013, 2014, 2015, 2016, 2017, 2018, 2019, 2020, 2021, 2022

Luchs (Lynx ) Award for Children's Literature July 2012 for The Golden Day (in German Nicht Jetz, niemals)

International Board on Books for Young People (IBBY) Honour Book List 2014 for The Golden Day

YALSA (Division of the American Library Association) Excellence in Non-fiction for Young Adults Nominee 2010 for  Word Snoop

International Youth Library White Ravens  1996 for The First Book of Samuel; 2007 for The Red Shoe; and 2019 for Midnight at the Library.

Australian

 2020–2021 – Australian Children's Laureate
  2013 – Inducted into Speech Pathology Australia's Hall of Fame for her contribution to children's literature
  2011 – Children's Book of the Year Award: Eve Pownall Award for Information Books for The Return of the Word Spy with illustrator Tohby Riddle
  2009 – New South Wales Premier's Literary Award, Patricia Wrightson Prize for Young People's Literature for The Word Spy with illustrator Tohby Riddle
  2009 – Junior Judges Project, Children's Book Council of Australia, Winner for The Word Spy with illustrator Tohby Riddle
  2009 – Kids Own Australian Literature Award (KOALA), Picture Book Winner for Rex with illustrator David Mackintosh
  2007 – New South Wales Premier's Literary Award, Ethel Turner Prize for Young People's Literature for The Red Shoe
  2006 – Queensland Premier's Literary Award, Young Adult Book Award for The Red Shoe
  2006 – New South Wales Premier's Literary Award, Ethel Turner Prize for Young People's Literature for Theodora's Gift
  2006 – Victorian Premier's Literary Award, Prize for Young Adult Literature for Theodora's Gift
  2001 – Adelaide Festival Awards for Literature, Award for Children's Literature for Abyssinia
  1995 – New South Wales Premier's Literary Award, Ethnic Affairs Commission Award for The First Book of Samuel
  1994 – New South Wales Premier's Literary Award, Ethel Turner Prize for Children's literature for The White Guinea Pig
  1994 – Victorian Premier's Literary Award, Alan Garner Prize for Children's Literature for The White Guinea Pig

Theatrical productions
 Too Many Elephants in This House was staged by the NIDA, the National Institute of Dramatic Art.
 The Red Shoe was staged by the Jigsaw Theatre.
Plop!, a musical version of The Terrible Plop was staged by the Windmill Theatre in Adelaide, Brisbane and Canberra, Sydney, regional Victoria, Queensland and Darwin. Plop! had season in the United States in 2012, including three weeks at the New Victory Theater in New York.

Bibliography

  Maisie and the Pinny Gig (1989)  illustrated by Roberta Landers 
  High Hopes (1990)
  Zizzy Zing (1991)
  The Last Week in December (1993)
  The White Guinea-Pig (1994)
  The First Book of Samuel (1995)
  Bruno and Crumhorn (1996)
  Black Sails, White Sails (1997)
  The Strange Adventures of Isador Brown (1998) illustrated by Paty Marshall-Stace
  My Father Is Not a Comedian! (1999)
  Honey and Bear (1999) illustrated by Ron Brooks
  The Even Stranger Adventures of Isador Brown (2000) illustrated by Paty Marshall-Stace
  The Game of the Goose (2000) illustrated by John Winch
  The Two Gorillas (2000) illustrated by Mitch Vane
  Fairy Bread (2001) illustrated by Mitch Vane
  Abyssinia (2001)
  The Magic Wand (2002) illustrated by Mitch Vane
  Special Days with Honey and Bear (2002) illustrated by Ron Brooks
  Isador Brown's Strangest Adventures of All (2003) illustrated by Mitch Vane
  How To Be a Great Detective (2004)
  Rex (2005) illustrated by David Mackintosh
  Theodora's Gift (2005)
  The Puppet Show (2006) illustrated by Mitch Vane
  The Red Shoe (2006)
  The Word Spy (2008) illustrated by Tohby Riddle Published in the United States as The Word Snoop (2009)
  Jerry (2008) illustrated by Patricia Mullins
  Tibby's Leaf (2009) illustrated by Peter Bray
  The Terrible Plop (2009) illustrated by Andrew Joyner
  The Cubby House (2009) illustrated by Mitch Vane
  The Deep End (2010) illustrated by Mitch Vane
  The Return of the Word Spy (2010) illustrated by Tohby Riddle
  The Honey and Bear Stories (2010) illustrated by Ron Brooks
  Free: Stories about Human Rights (2010) (contributor) Amnesty International/Walker Books UK
  The Golden Day (2011)
  The Carousel (2011) illustrated by Walter di Qual
  The Word Spy Activity Book (2012) illustrated by Tohby Riddle
  Too Many Elephants in This House (2012) illustrated by Andrew Joyner
  The Cryptic Casebook of Coco Carlomagno and Alberta: The Perplexing Pineapple (2013) illustrated by Terry Denton
  The Cryptic Casebook of Coco Carlomagno and Alberta: The Looming Lamplight (2013) illustrated by Terry Denton
  The Cryptic Casebook of Coco Carlomagno and Alberta: The Missing Mongoose (2013) illustrated by Terry Denton
  Violet Vanishes (2013) illustrated by Annie White
  Rory Rides (2013) illustrated by Annie White
  Ethan Eats (2013) illustrated by Annie White
  Ava Adds (2013) illustrated by Annie White
    Introduction to Lillypilly Hill (2013) Eleanor Spence Text Classics
  The Cryptic Casebook of Coco Carlomagno and Alberta: The Dismal Daffodil (2014) illustrated by Terry Denton
  The Cryptic Casebook of Coco Carlomagno and Alberta: The Quivering Quavers (2014) illustrated by Terry Denton
  The Cryptic Casebook of Coco Carlomagno and Alberta: The Talkative Tombstone (2014) illustrated by Terry Denton
  Two Tales of Twins from Ancient Greece and Rome (2014) illustrated by David Allan
  The Great War: Stories inspired by objects from the First World War (2014) (contributor) Walker Books UK
  Tim and Ed (2014) illustrated by Andrew Joyner
  Reindeer's Christmas Surprise (2014) illustrated by Sue de Gennaro
  One Little Goat (2017) illustrated by Andrew Joyner
  The Blue Cat (2017) 
  Brindabella (2018) illustrated by Andrew Joyner
  Leaf Stone Beetle (2018) illustrated by Gaye Chapman
  Midnight at the Library (2018) illustrated by Ron Brooks
  The Boy Who Could Fly and other magical plays for children (2019) illustrated by Amy Golbach 
  Ask Hercules Quick (2019) illustrated by Andrew Joyner
  Pierre's Not There (2020) illustrated by Christopher Nielsen
  The March of the Ants (2021) illustrated by Tohby Riddle
  The Magnificent Hercules Quick (2021) illustrated by Andrew Joyner
  Mary and Marcus and the Crazy Dance (2022) illustrated by Andrew Joyner
  Hercules Quick's Big Bag of Tricks (2023) illustrated by Andrew Joyner

Critical studies, reviews and biography
 Review of The Golden Day.

References

 The Cambridge Guide to Children's Books in English (2001) edited by Victor Watson
 The Oxford Companion to Australian Children's Literature (1993) edited by Stella Lees and Pam Macintyre
 1001 Children's Books You Must Read Before You Grow Up (2009) edited by Julia Eccleshore Cassell Illustrated, London.

External links

  Official Website
 Profile at publisher Penguin Books Australia 
 The Golden Day  
 
 

1961 births
Living people
Australian women novelists
Australian children's writers
University of Sydney alumni
20th-century Australian novelists
20th-century Australian women writers
People educated at Sydney Church of England Girls Grammar School
Writers from Sydney